
The following lists events that happened during 1841 in South Africa.

Events
 Missionary David Livingstone arrives in the Cape Colony and proceeds to Kuruman before journeying through Central Africa.
 Voortrekkers set up a council in Potchefstroom

Deaths
 1 May - Sir Rufane Shaw Donkin, acting Governor of the Cape Colony who supervised the arrival and settling of the British settlers and who founded Port Elizabeth, dies in Southampton, England

References
See Years in South Africa for list of References

 
South Africa
Years in South Africa